Focus is a 2015 American crime comedy-drama film written and directed by Glenn Ficarra and John Requa, starring Will Smith and Margot Robbie. The plot follows a career con artist who takes an aspiring femme fatale under his wing.

The film was released on February 27, 2015. It received mixed reviews from critics but was a success at the box office, grossing $158 million against its $50 million budget.

Plot
Seasoned con-man Nicky Spurgeon (Will Smith) meets an inexperienced grifter, Jess Barrett (Margot Robbie), who tries to seduce and con him, pretending they've been caught by her jealous husband. When they fail, Nicky advises them never to lose focus when faced with unexpected situations. Nicky follows Jess and convinces her to have drinks, he tells her how his father shot his grandfather in a stand-off, explaining the "Toledo Panic Button" tactic, in which you shoot your partner to show your loyalty.

Jess follows him to New Orleans, successfully persuading Nicky to take her under his wing, where she is also introduced to Nicky's crew, including Farhad (Adrian Martinez) and fellow con-man Horst (Brennan Brown). Picking a few pockets as a test, Nicky and Jess develop a romantic relationship, upsetting Nicky, who was taught by his father to never become emotionally involved with any colleagues. At a fictional Super Bowl XVII, Nicky gets into a round of increasingly extravagant bets with gambler Liyuan Tse (B.D. Wong), eventually losing all of the money the crew has earned.

To win it back, Nicky asks Tse to pick any player on or off the field and says that Jess will guess the number picked. A distraught Jess scans the field and sees Farhad wearing jersey number 55, and realizes it is another con. They take Tse for millions of dollars.  Nicky explains to Jess how Tse had been programmed to pick 55 since he arrived, with subtle, subconscious prompts throughout his day. This victory leaves Tse impressed and even graciously gives all the money back to Nicky. Nicky then leaves Jess with her cut, and instructs the driver to take her to the airport.  Jess cries as her limo drives off, as Nicky climbs into another waiting car.

Three years later, Nicky goes to Buenos Aires, working for billionaire motorsport team owner Rafael Garriga (Rodrigo Santoro). Garriga wants to beat a team headed by Australian businessman McEwen (Robert Taylor) to win the championship. Nicky will pretend to be a disgruntled technician on Garriga's team willing to sell Garriga's custom fuel use algorithm EXR. Instead, he will sell McEwen a bogus version which will slow their car down during the race. At a pre-race party, Nicky runs into Jess, who is now Garriga's girlfriend. After faking heavy drinking upon seeing Jess, Nicky has a convincing fight with Garriga in public and after being thrown out, is recruited by McEwen to provide the component.

Nicky begins pursuing Jess again, and they eventually rekindle their relationship. The head of Garriga's security entourage, Owens (Gerald McRaney), is suspicious and narrowly misses catching the two together. Nicky not only delivers the real component to McEwen for three million euros but also sells it to the other teams for similar amounts.

Nicky and Jess attempt to return to the US together. However, they are caught by Garriga's men and taken to his garage. Jess is tied up and her mouth is taped shut whilst Nicky is given a beating. Garriga is convinced that Jess had something to do with Nicky gaining access to EXR and begins to suffocate the gagged Jess. To save her, Nicky explains that he gained access to EXR by tricking her into believing he still had feelings for her and that the necklace he had given her was equipped to secretly record Garriga's password and login information. He explains that Jess was conned and knew nothing about this. However, Jess then reveals that she was only trying to seduce Garriga in order to steal his valuable watch and to make Nicky jealous.

Nicky promises to come clean in order to spare Jess's life, but Owens shoots him in the chest, causing a horrified Garriga to leave. Owens then reveals himself to be Nicky's father, Bucky, and assures Jess that he avoided any major arteries. He simply employed the "Toledo Panic Button". Bucky then tapes up Nicky's wounds and draws excess blood out of his son's chest with a plunger so that he can breathe. They flee the garage in Garriga's vehicle.

Bucky drives Nicky and Jess to the hospital to treat Nicky's punctured lung. Before he drops them off, he reveals to Nicky the real reason why he left him on the streets: during a poker deal in Boston, he got a gun pulled on him, and all he could think about then was Nicky. He says he then walked away and never looked back. After emphasizing that love will get one killed in the game, Bucky departs with all the money as a reminder of the consequences of losing focus. After he leaves, Nicky notices that Jess snatched Garriga's $200,000 watch before he left the warehouse, and a smiling Nicky and Jess walk towards the hospital entrance together.

Cast
 Will Smith as Nicky Spurgeon
 Margot Robbie as Jess Barrett
 Rodrigo Santoro as Rafael Garriga
 Gerald McRaney as Bucky Spurgeon / Owens
 Adrian Martinez as Farhad
 B. D. Wong as Liyuan Tse
 Robert Taylor as McEwen
 Dominic Fumusa as Jared Mukulski
 Brennan Brown as Horst
 Griff Furst as Gareth
 Juan Minujin as Barman
 Stephanie Honoré as Janice

Production
Apollo Robbins served as a consultant, conceiving and choreographing original sleight-of-hand maneuvers. Directors Ficarra and Requa stated, "Apollo is the foremost expert in his field and is an inspiration to us."

The directing duo and production designer Beth Mickle made a scouting trip to Buenos Aires in June and a second trip with producers Denise Di Novi and Mark Scoon, in which they finally settled to shoot in the neighborhoods of San Telmo, Puerto Madero, Barracas, Retiro, Recoleta and Palermo, as well as Ezeiza Airport and a few hotels.

Neil Smith spoke at the Digital Cinema Society forum dropping several hints as to the identity of a film being edited in Final Cut Pro X in a December 2013 presentation. This would make Focus the largest production yet completed in Apple's editing program.

Filming
Principal photography began on September 14, 2013, in New Orleans, and moved over to Buenos Aires on November 19, 2013, for three weeks. The last day of shooting in Argentina was on December 10. Filming wrapped in New York City on December 17, 2013.

Release

Theatrical release
The film was released in 2015 in the US and Germany. On January 29, 2015, Warner Bros. and IMAX Corporation announced that they would digitally re-master the film into the immersive IMAX DMR format, also for release on the same date.

Home media
Focus was released on DVD and Blu-ray/DVD combo pack on June 2, 2015.

Reception

Box office
Focus grossed $53.9 million in North America and $104.9 million in other territories for a total gross of $158.8 million, against a production budget of $50.1 million.

The film grossed $6.4 million in its opening day, $7.6 million on its second day and $4.6 million on its third day, totaling $18.7 million in its opening weekend, while playing in 3,323 theaters (a $5,623 per-theatre average), finishing first place at the box office. The film was also released in the theatres of 39 markets of other territories in same weekend of its North America release, and grossed an estimated $12.2 million. Its biggest territories were the United Kingdom ($13 million), Russia ($3.1 million) and Netherlands ($1,765,832).

Critical response
On Rotten Tomatoes, the film has a rating of 56%, based on 228 reviews, with an average rating of 5.80/10. The site's consensus reads, "Focus may have a few too many twists and turns, but it nearly skates by on its glamorous setting and the charm of its stars." On Metacritic, the film has a weighted average score of 56 out of 100, based on 42 critics, indicating "mixed or average reviews". Audiences polled by CinemaScore gave the film a grade of "B" on an A+ to F scale.

Richard Roeper of the Chicago Sun-Times called it "sheer, escapist entertainment from start to finish." The Free Press Journal called the film "smart, slick, but shallow". Nick De Semlyen of Empire wrote: "This is maximum-gloss entertainment with its fair share of tricksy rug-pulls. But, like one of the neon-coloured cocktails Smith drinks in it, it’s more of an immediate rush than something you’ll remember in a year."

Soundtrack
The soundtrack album was released on February 24, 2015, by WaterTower Music.

 "I'm a Manchild" – Uptown Funk Empire
 "Sofa Rockers (Richard Dorfmeister Remix)" – Sofa Surfers
 "Please!" – Edward Sharpe and the Magnetic Zeros
 "Wind It Up" – Stooges Brass Band
 "You Don't Have to Worry" – Doris & Kelley
 "Meet Me in the City" – Junior Kimbrough
 "Sympathy for the Devil" - The Rolling Stones
 "Gimme Danger" – The Stooges
 "Chorra" – Los Mareados
 "La Espada de Cadorna" – Mauro Alberelli, Fernando Diego, Barreyro, Maria Carla Flores, Fermin Echeveste, Manuel Gonzalez Aguilar, Mateo Gonzalez Aguilar and Carlos Maximiliano Russo
 "Gerli Hood" – Ivan Diaz Mathe, Jorge Estenbenet, Sebastian Martinez, Francisco Olivero, Daniel Michel, Juan Manuel Meyer and Gala Iglesias Brickles featuring Camilo Costaldi Lira and Alberto Manuel Rodriguez
 "Corazon de Piedra (Te Amo)" – Alenjandro Medina
 "White Bird" – It's a Beautiful Day
 "Love Makes the World Go Round" – Barbara Lewis
 "Focus (Love Theme)" – Nick Urata
 "The Windmills of Your Mind" – Ray Conniff and The Singers

References

External links
 

2015 films
2015 comedy-drama films
2015 crime drama films
2015 crime thriller films
2010s comedy thriller films
2010s crime comedy-drama films
American comedy thriller films
American crime comedy-drama films
American crime thriller films
Dune Entertainment films
2010s English-language films
Films about con artists
Films about interracial romance
Films directed by Glenn Ficarra and John Requa
Films produced by Denise Di Novi
Films set in Buenos Aires
Films set in New Orleans
Films shot in Buenos Aires
Films shot in New Orleans
Films shot in New York City
IMAX films
Overbrook Entertainment films
Warner Bros. films
2010s American films